Dodewaard nuclear power plant was a nuclear power plant with a 55 MWe boiling water reactor (BWR) of General Electric in the Dutch town of Dodewaard. The plant halted energy production in 1997. Its final decommissioning has been postponed for a period of 40 years and was placed into a safe enclosure configuration in 2005.

History

The plant in Dodewaard was the first nuclear power plant established in the Netherlands. It was built by the Dutch government, mainly as a means to obtain know-how about the construction and exploitation of a nuclear power plant. The plant was therefore relatively small with a net output of only 58 MW. Construction was started in 1965 and the facility opened on 26 March 1969, in the presence of Queen Juliana.

After the Chernobyl disaster in 1986, the political tide turned against nuclear energy, which was already a heavily debated issue in Dutch politics. With no prospect of the construction of new nuclear power plants in the Netherlands, Dodewaard's function as a research centre became superfluous. The ownership decided to halt electricity production at the relatively small and expensive plant in 1997.

Closure and decommissioning 
On 26 March 1997 the complex was shut down, seven years earlier than originally planned. After a period of forty years, the plant will be demolished and the site will become available for other purposes.

In May 2002 a decommissioning license was granted to Gemeenschappelijke Kernenergiecentrale Nederland (GKN), the operator of the nuclear power plant. In July 2005, the safe enclosure was achieved. Dismantling is planned to start in 2045. The spent nuclear fuel was reprocessed in Sellafield and sent back to the interim storage facility Central Organisation for Radioactive Waste (COVRA), where all Dutch radioactive waste will be stored for 100 years or longer.,p.171

On 21 May 2020 a fire broke out on the roof of the outer containment building which took several hours to bring under control. According to the authorities no radioactive material was released into the environment during the incident.

References

External links
 
 

Nuclear power stations with closed reactors
Nuclear power stations in the Netherlands
Buildings and structures in Gelderland
Neder-Betuwe